Berkov or Berkoff is a surname of Jewish (Berkovich) or Dutch/German origin (Berkhoff). In Slavic countries it is only used for men, while the feminine variant is Berkova or Berková. Notable people with the name include:

 David Berkoff (born 1966), an American swimmer
 Steven Berkoff (born 1937), an English actor
 Vasily Berkov (1794–1870), Russian shipbuilder
 Alexandra Berková (1949–2008), Czech writer and educator
 Dagmar Berková (1922–2002), Czech graphic designer, illustrator and painter
 Elena Berkova (born 1985), Russian model, television presenter, singer and actress
 Renata Berková (born 1975), Czech Olympic triathlete

See also
Berkhoff (surname)
Bercow